Floyd Bluford "Butch" Henry III (born October 7, 1968) is an American former Major League Baseball (MLB) pitcher who played for five MLB teams from 1992 to 1999. Henry has also been a coach in Minor League Baseball and a manager in independent baseball.

Playing career
Henry was selected by the Cincinnati Reds in the 15th round of the 1987 MLB draft. He was 23 years old when he made his major league debut on April 9, 1992, with the Houston Astros.

During his career, Henry had a record of 33–33, with a 3.83 ERA and 345 strikeouts in 621 innings pitched. He also played for the Montreal Expos, Boston Red Sox and the Seattle Mariners. He had the best year of his career with the 1994 Expos, when he posted an 8–3 record with a 2.43 ERA.

After spending the entire 2000 season on the disabled list, and a short-lived comeback attempt in the minors in 2001, Henry announced his retirement in 2003 due to arm troubles.

Post-playing career
Henry later served as a coach in 2004 for the Sarasota Reds of the Gulf Coast League. The following year, he was the pitching coach for the Billings Mustangs of the Pioneer League, the Rookie Advanced affiliate of the Cincinnati Reds.

Henry became manager for the El Paso Diablos of the American Association of Independent Professional Baseball in 2006. In 2007, he led the Diablos to a South Division-best record of 56–40 and a playoff berth, the team's first since 2000, when they played in the Texas League. The 2007 team's batting and pitching vastly improved under Henry's guidance. The batting average for the Diablos was 15 points higher (.279 to .294), while the pitching ERA was almost a full two runs lower (6.18 to 4.37) as compared to 2006. The Diablos also led the league in runs scored and hits and were second in team batting average. As a result, Henry won American Association Manager of the Year honors. Henry's final season with the Diablos was 2010—the team compiled a record of 205–268 during the five seasons that Henry managed the club.

Personal life
Henry is a 2010 inductee of the El Paso Athletic Hall of Fame.

References

External links

1968 births
Living people
American Association of Professional Baseball managers
American expatriate baseball players in Canada
Baseball coaches from Texas
Baseball players from Texas
Billings Mustangs players
Boston Red Sox players
Cedar Rapids Reds players
Chattanooga Lookouts players
Colorado Rockies players
Columbus Clippers players
Houston Astros players
Indianapolis Indians players
Major League Baseball pitchers
Minor league baseball coaches
Minor league baseball managers
Montreal Expos players
Navegantes del Magallanes players
American expatriate baseball players in Venezuela
Ottawa Lynx players
Sarasota Red Sox players
Seattle Mariners players
Sportspeople from El Paso, Texas
Syracuse SkyChiefs players
Tacoma Rainiers players
Tucson Toros players